Eilema diliensis is a moth of the subfamily Arctiinae. It is found in New Caledonia.

References

 Natural History Museum Lepidoptera generic names catalog

diliensis